APBS (previously also Advanced Poisson-Boltzmann Solver) is a free and open-source software for solving the equations of continuum electrostatics intended primarily for the large biomolecular systems. It is available under the MIT License.

PDB2PQR prepares the protein structure files from Protein Data Bank for use with APBS. The preparation steps include, but aren't limited to adding missing heavy atoms to the structures and assigning charges from a number of force fields. The output file format is PQR and that's where the name of the software comes from.

References

External links 

Official documentation
APBS, PDB2PQR, and related software - GitHub

Molecular modelling software
Molecular modelling
Free and open-source software